Gundlachia radiata is a species of minute freshwater snail or limpet, an aquatic pulmonate gastropod mollusk or micromollusk in the family Planorbidae.

Distribution 
The current distribution of G. radiata ranges from southern United States to northwestern Argentina.

References

Planorbidae
Gastropods described in 1828